Seton is the surname of a prominent Scottish Lowlands family, Clan Seton, and may refer to:

Hereditary titles 
 The Earls of Winton
 The Earls of Huntly
 The Earls of Dunfermline
 The Earls of Eglinton
 The Viscounts Kingston
 The Baronet of Windygoul
 The Baronets of Abercorn
 The Baronets of Garleton
 The Baronets of Pitmedden

Given names of several Setons 
Alexander Seton (disambiguation)
George Seton (disambiguation)
John Seton (disambiguation)

Other 
 Alex Seton (born 1977), Australian artist
 Anya Seton (1906–1990), American historical novelist, daughter of Ernest Thompson Seton
 Archibald Seton (1758–1818), Scottish East India Company colonial administrator, resident, and civil servant
 Barry Seton (born 1936), Australian racing driver
 Bruce Seton (1909–1969), British actor and soldier
 Catherine Seton (1800–1891), daughter of Elizabeth Ann Seton
 Christopher Seton (died 1306), 13th-century Scottish noble
 Cora Seton (born 1969), author
 Cynthia Propper Seton (1926–1982), American novelist
 Elizabeth Ann Seton (1774–1821), American Catholic saint
 Ernest Thompson Seton (1860–1946), Canadian-American scouting pioneer
 George Seton (1822–1908), Scottish philanthropist and genealogist
 Glenn Seton (born 1965), Australian racing driver, son of Barry Seton
 James Alexander Seton (1816–1845), last British person to be killed in a duel on English soil
 John de Seton (died 1306), Scottish knight
 Josiah Seton (born 1979), Liberian footballer
 Maria Seton, Australian geologist
 Marie Seton (1910–1985), film critic and biographer
 Mary Seton (1549–1615), daughter of George Seton, 6th Lord Seton, one of the "Four Marys" of Mary, Queen of Scots
 Robert Seton (1839–1927), Monsignor, American Catholic Archbishop and historian
 Thomas Seton (c.1738–1806), Scottish painter
 William Seton (writer) (1835–1905), American author, novelist and popular science writer
 William Seton, 1st Lord Seton (died 1410), Scottish noble
 William Seton of Kylesmure (1562–1635), Scottish landowner and postmaster

See also
Seton-Watson (disambiguation), surname
Seton Hall (disambiguation), several places
Seton (disambiguation)

Surnames of Lowland Scottish origin